The 1961 Kansas State Wildcats football team represented Kansas State University in the 1961 NCAA University Division football season.  The team's head football coach was Doug Weaver.  The Wildcats played their home games in Memorial Stadium.  1961 saw the Wildcats finish with a record of 2–8, and a 0–7 record in Big Eight Conference play.  The Wildcats scored only 58 points while giving up 232. The finished eighth in the Big Eight.

Schedule

References

Kansas State
Kansas State Wildcats football seasons
Kansas State Wildcats football